Guynesomia is a genus of Chilean flowering plants in the tribe Astereae within the family Asteraceae.

The genus is named in honor of US botanist Guy L. Nesom.

Species
The only known species is Guynesomia scoparia, native to the Coquimbo Region in Chile.

References

Endemic flora of Chile
Astereae
Monotypic Asteraceae genera